Grand Acres is a census-designated place (CDP) in Cameron County, Texas, United States. The population was 49 at the 2010 census. It is part of the Brownsville–Harlingen Metropolitan Statistical Area.

Geography
Grand Acres is located in northwestern Cameron County at  (26.240505, -97.828732).

Demographics
As of the census of 2000, there were 203 people, 49 households, and 46 families residing in the CDP. The population density was 421.8 people per square mile (163.3/km2). There were 54 housing units at an average density of 112.2/sq mi (43.4/km2). The racial makeup of the CDP was 54.19% White, 43.35% from other races, and 2.46% from two or more races. Hispanic or Latino of any race were 93.10% of the population.

There were 49 households, out of which 51.0% had children under the age of 18 living with them, 71.4% were married couples living together, 20.4% had a female householder with no husband present, and 6.1% were non-families. 4.1% of all households were made up of individuals, and 2.0% had someone living alone who was 65 years of age or older. The average household size was 4.14 and the average family size was 4.28.

In the CDP, the population was spread out, with 36.5% under the age of 18, 11.3% from 18 to 24, 26.1% from 25 to 44, 17.2% from 45 to 64, and 8.9% who were 65 years of age or older. The median age was 26 years. For every 100 females, there were 118.3 males. For every 100 females age 18 and over, there were 92.5 males.

The median income for a household in the CDP was $25,625, and the median income for a family was $25,547. Males had a median income of $21,500 versus $13,438 for females. The per capita income for the CDP was $5,807. About 27.9% of families and 34.9% of the population were below the poverty line, including 46.9% of those under the age of eighteen and 34.8% of those 65 or over.

Education
Grand Acres is served by the Santa Rosa Independent School District.

In addition, South Texas Independent School District operates magnet schools that serve the community.

References

Census-designated places in Cameron County, Texas
Census-designated places in Texas